Valbuena Abbey is a former Cistercian monastery in Valbuena de Duero in Valladolid Province, Castile-Leon, Spain. It stands on the right bank of the Duero, within sight of the royal castle of Peñafiel.

History 

The monastery was founded in 1143 by Estefanía, daughter of Count Ermengol V of Urgell, and settled from Berdoues Abbey in France, of the filiation of Morimond.

The first two abbots were Martin and Ebrardo. Valbuena received a number of privileges shortly after its foundation, and flourished to the point where it was able to settle three daughter houses of its own: Rioseco Abbey, founded in 1148; Bonaval Abbey, founded in 1164; and Palazuelos Abbey, founded in 1169.

In the 14th century a decline set in.

Valbuena remained a daughter house of Berdoues until 1430, when the Castilian Cistercian Congregation was established; thereafter it was a daughter house of Poblet Abbey.

The abbey was dissolved under the anti-ecclesiastical Mendizábal government in 1835.

The church became a parish church.

The site was used as Francoist concentration camp, operating at least from April to May 1939.

The conventual buildings passed into private ownership and were eventually acquired by a Baron Kessel, who sold them to Juan Pardo, who looked after them until 1950, when the Instituto Nacional de Colonización acquired the site and buildings for settlement purposes. In 1967 the Archdiocese of Valladolid took possession of the monastery buildings, and in 1990 leased them to the foundation Las Edades del Hombre.

Buildings and site 

The building complex, which was more or less complete by 1230, and most of which still stands, comprises the church, built from 1149 onwards, the conventual buildings, the guest wing, dormitories and the lay brothers' area. The groin-vaulted church of three aisles in four bays, with a barrel-vaulted transept and a crossing which was heightened in the Renaissance and covered with a cupola, is largely in accordance with the usual Cistercian building practice. The church also has an unusually large semi-circular apse, between two smaller semi-circular side apses, and also a rectangular side-chapel, built in 1165. The nave is in the early Gothic style. The west front has a portal with a pointed arch and several archivolts, over which is a large oculus in a blind arch.

The chapter house and the day room are also groin-vaulted, while the refectory on the south side of the complex has a pointed barrel-vaulted roof of four bays. The cloister has two storeys. The Capilla San Pedro ("St. Peter's Chapel") contains an arcosolium with a mural of a king from the period of around 1270. The lay brothers' wing was removed in the Renaissance to make room for a second courtyard. By the river stand the ruins of the abbot's house, dating from the 16th century.

The abbey was declared a national monument in 1931.

Notes

References  
 Herbosa, Vicente, 2003: El Románico en Valladolid. León: Ediciones Lancia. 
 Karge, Henrik, 1992: Gotische Architektur in Kastilien und León, in: Spanische Kunstgeschichte – eine Einführung (ed. Sylvaine Hensel and Henrik Karge), vol. 1. Berlin: Dietrich Reimer Verlag. 
 Schomann, Heinz, 1997: Kunstdenkmäler der iberischen Halbinsel, vol. 2. Darmstadt: Wissenschaftliche Buchgesellschaft (no ISBN)

External links 

 Arteguía: article with photos 
 Revistaiberica: article with photos 
 North Castile 

Cistercian monasteries in Spain
Churches in Castile and León
Bien de Interés Cultural landmarks in the Province of Valladolid
Romanesque architecture in Castile and León
Christian monasteries established in the 12th century
1143 establishments in Europe
12th-century establishments in the Kingdom of León
Francoist concentration camps